was a town located in Nomi District, Ishikawa Prefecture, Japan.

As of 2003, the town had an estimated population of 15,880 and a density of 1,170.23 persons per km². The total area was 13.57 km².

On February 1, 2005, Neagari, along with the towns of Tatsunokuchi and Terai (all from Nomi District), was merged to create the city of Nomi and no longer exists as an independent municipality.

People
Shigeki Mori, former mayor, father of ex-prime minister Yoshiro Mori.
Hideki Matsui, Former MLB Designated Hitter and Outfielder.

External links
 Official website of Nomi 

Dissolved municipalities of Ishikawa Prefecture
Nomi, Ishikawa